Allison Dweh (born 14 March 1990), also known as Dweh Allison, is a Liberian footballer who plays for Watanga FC as a forward.

Club career
Dweh spent his early career in Liberia, playing for local sides in Monrovia.

In 2011, he was signed by Palmeiras to play for their B team, becoming the first Liberian footballer to play in Brazil.

International career
Dweh made his international debut for the Liberia national football team on 22 June 2015, in a 3-1 loss to Guinea, in which he scored his team's goal.

International goals
Scores and results list Liberia's goal tally first.

References

External links
 
 
 

1990 births
Living people
Association football forwards
Liberian footballers
Sportspeople from Monrovia
Rio Claro Futebol Clube players
Liberia international footballers